Kim Sung-il (김성일) may refer to:
 Kim Seong-il (1538–1593), Joseon Dynasty politician
 Kim Sung-il (general) (born 1948)
 Kim Sung-il (footballer) (born 1973)
 Kim Seoung-il (born 1990), South Korean short track speed skater
 Kim Song-il (North Korean politician)
Kim Song-il (gymnast), North Korean gymnast

See also
 Kim Seung-il (disambiguation) (김승일)